"Viva la Vida" is a song by British rock band Coldplay. It was written by all members of the band for their fourth album, Viva la Vida or Death and All His Friends (2008). The lyrics to the song contain historical and Christian references, and the track is built around a looping string section in unison with a digitally processed piano, with other layers gradually being added as the song builds.

The track was released on 13 June 2008 as the album's second single, debuting to critical acclaim and commercial success. "Viva la Vida" reached the top spot of the UK Singles Chart and Billboard Hot 100, becoming the band's first number-one single in both the U.S. and U.K. The song won the Grammy Award for Song of the Year at the 51st Annual Grammy Awards in 2009.

Background
The song's Spanish title, "Viva la Vida", is taken from a painting by 20th-century Mexican artist Frida Kahlo. In Spanish,  is an expression used to acclaim someone or something, so "Long Live Life" is an accurate translation and the painting reflects the artistic irony of acclaiming life while suffering physically. When asked about the album's title, referring to Frida Kahlo's strength, enduring polio, a broken spine, and a decade of chronic pain, lead singer Chris Martin said: "She went through a lot of pain, of course, and then she started a big painting in her house that said 'Viva la Vida', I just loved the boldness of it."

During the album's production, "Viva la Vida" was one of the songs that had polarised each member's opinion over which version they should choose. In an interview, Martin recalled: "We did quite a few different versions and went round the houses a bit and eventually settled on those treatments for it."

Composition

The lyrics to "Viva la Vida" are narrated by a protagonist who says he "used to rule the world". Martin has explained the song lyric "I know Saint Peter won't call my name" in an interview with Q magazine: "It's about ... You're not on the list" to enter the pearly gates. When asked about the song, bass guitarist Guy Berryman said: "It's a story about a king who's lost his kingdom, and all the album's artwork is based on the idea of revolutionaries and guerrillas. There's this slightly anti-authoritarian viewpoint that's crept into some of the lyrics and it's some of the pay-off between being surrounded by governments on one side, but also we're human beings with emotions and we're all going to die and the stupidity of what we have to put up with every day. Hence the album title."

Unlike the then-typical arrangement of Coldplay songs, in which either the guitar or piano is the prominent instrument, the track mostly consists of a string section and a digital piano playing the song's upbeat riff, along with a steady bass drum beat, percussion (including a timpano and a church bell), bass guitar, and Martin's vocals; there is limited use of electric guitar. All the strings are arranged and conducted by violinist Davide Rossi, who is one of the main collaborators of the album. Rossi's strings comprise the main driving force throughout the song, with a strong beginning loop that supports Martin's voice, until the choruses where the symphonic power of the orchestra takes its fullest shape. The prominent chords played by the string section throughout the song (and in the chorus of "Rainy Day", another of the band's songs) are very similar to those used by "Viva la Vida" co-producer Brian Eno in his piece "An Ending (Ascent)", meaning they could have been suggested partially for the song by Eno.

The song is written in the key of A-flat major. Its main chord progression is D♭5/E♭/A♭/Fm. The time signature is 4/4 and the tempo is 138 beats per minute.

Release and promotion
"Viva la Vida" was initially released only with iTunes Store pre-orders of Viva la Vida or Death and All His Friends on 7 May 2008 – the "new edit" version of the song – which led to the song's temporary exclusion from the UK Singles Chart. It was released as a download-only single on 25 May 2008, and a physical CD single in Europe on 29 July 2008 to coincide with the release of the single's music videos. "Viva la Vida" was well-downloaded in the internet, becoming iTunes' best-selling song of 2008.

The song was used as part of Apple Inc.'s iPod + iTunes advertisement campaign. Coldplay performed the song live for the first time at the 2008 MTV Movie Awards. It has since gone on to make many media appearances, including being featured throughout the episode "A Person of Interest" from the paranormal drama Medium, as a song played on the radio in the episode "We're Not in Kansas Anymore" from the teen drama 90210, used as bumper music on Bill Bennett's "Morning in America" radio talk show, and on the international soundtrack to the Brazilian soap opera A Favorita which helped push "Viva la Vida" up the charts in Brazil, where the telenovela had been shown. In 2009, Solange Knowles covered the song. Lady Gaga also covered the song for BBC Radio 1. Live versions of the song have appeared on the 2009 live album LeftRightLeftRightLeft, the 2012 album Live 2012, and the 2018 album Live in Buenos Aires.
It was also used in an episode entitled "Million Dollar Maybe" of The Simpsons. The song was covered in the seventh series of The X Factor by the boyband One Direction in 2010.

Music videos

The official music video for "Viva la Vida" was directed by Hype Williams and premiered at Coldplay's official website on 1 August 2008. The video depicts the band performing against a blurry, warped version of Eugène Delacroix's painting La Liberté guidant le peuple, ending with the band members crumbling into rose petals.

A second, alternate video was shot in The Hague, the Netherlands, directed by Anton Corbijn and released alongside the first. This second version is a tribute to Corbijn's video for Depeche Mode's "Enjoy the Silence" and portrays Chris Martin as the king from whose perspective the song is sung. During the video, he carries Delacroix's painting. At the end, he hangs the picture up in a white stall on top of a hill. As he sings the last chorus, his bandmates surface heading his way, tying in loose ends from the "Violet Hill" video.

Critical reception

"Viva la Vida" received widespread critical acclaim. In the Entertainment Weekly review of the album, critic Chris Willman wrote: "Take the title track ... on which [Martin] imagines himself as a paranoid monarch. 'Who would ever want to be king?' Martin asks. 'Revolutionaries wait/For my head on a silver plate!' The confident majesty of the music, however, belies how he and his bandmates  have invigorated their rock-lite reign." Josh Hathaway from The Plain Dealer noted "Viva la Vida" as the "catchiest" song on the album. Chris Jones of the BBC noted: "The string/brass mutations that bolster a track like 'Viva La Vida' ... conjure tunes so sweetly melancholy." In the IGN review, critic Chad Grischow wrote, "It is their one and only foray into unabashed orchestral pop, but the punchy strut of the strings and fantastic marching vocals make it far too charming and lively to dislike, and even harder not to love."

"Viva la Vida" was nominated for "Record of the Year", and won "Song of the Year", and "Best Pop Performance by a Duo or a Group" at the 2009 Grammy Awards. This song also won the Ivor Novello Award for "Best Selling British Single". The song was included in Rolling Stone's annual "100 Best Songs" of 2008 at number nine; it was also voted number two on Rolling Stone's Readers' Rock List: Best Songs of 2008. "Viva la Vida" was also listed at number five on Blender's 1001 Downloads: The Top 144 Songs of 2008, as well in the number eight position on Village Voice's Pazz and Jop list. According to Acclaimed Music, it is the 489th most celebrated song in popular music history, and the 2nd best song of 2008. "Viva la Vida" has been sampled in several other songs, including Flo Rida's "Be on You", Mac Miller's "Cut the Check" featuring Chief Keef and Drake's "Congratulations" from his So Far Gone mixtape. In 2019, Billboard ranked the song number seven on their list of the 50 greatest Coldplay songs. In 2021, American Songwriter ranked the song number one on their list of the 10 greatest Coldplay songs.

Rankings

Chart performance
"Viva la Vida" has become the band's highest charting single. Fueled by high digital sales, the song peaked at the top spot of the U.S. Billboard Hot 100, becoming the band's first US number-one single and their second top ten on the Hot 100. It is the first song by a British group to reach number-one on the Billboard Hot 100 since "Wannabe" by the Spice Girls in 1997. Although the song was initially successful in digital sales, after being released, it went on to become the band's highest-charting single in American radio, becoming their first top-ten hit on the Hot 100 Airplay where it peaked at number eight. It had also become the band's first number-one single on the Billboard Modern Rock Tracks chart.  On the Billboard Hot Adult Top 40 Tracks, the song has become the band's first number one, as well as the first single on the Capitol Records label to ever top the chart. The single has been certified triple platinum by the Recording Industry Association of America. The song also became one of the first six tracks to reach the 4 million mark in paid digital downloads.

The single was also successful in the United Kingdom. Although the song had been disqualified from the UK charts due to initially being available only by pre-ordering the album on iTunes, it became eligible to chart after the album was released. "Viva la Vida" hit number one on the UK Singles Chart, becoming Coldplay's first chart-topping single in the UK.

In Canada, the single made a "Hot Shot Debut" at number four on the Canadian Hot 100 on the issue of 24 May, making it Coldplay's highest debut there. It is also one of Coldplay's three highest-charting singles in Australia, reaching number two (both "A Sky Full of Stars" and "Something Just Like This" matched this peak in 2014 and 2017, respectively). In New Zealand, the song was less successful, only peaking at number 16; however, the song stayed in the top 40 for 27 non-consecutive weeks. In Spain, the single peaked at #2 and achieved Triple Platinum status due to the 120,000 copies sold. It also had a strong airplay on the Spanish radio stations.

Sporting usage

During the 2008–09 season, the German football club Hamburger SV used "Viva la Vida" as their goal celebration song.
It's also the goal celebration song of the German football club Hannover 96.
The song also became the anthem of Spanish football club FC Barcelona during the 2008–09 season. It turned out to be a season of unprecedented success for the Spanish club in 2009, as they won all six competitions they could possibly be involved in, which no football club has managed before in history. The song was selected by the manager of the club, Pep Guardiola – himself a Coldplay fan – to help motivate and encourage his team. It was often played at the Camp Nou before the start of a Barcelona match. The song was also played during Pep Guardiola's farewell before his final match coaching Barcelona at the Nou Camp, a 4–0 victory against Espanyol on 5 May 2012. The song was also played on Gerard Pique's final game at the Camp Nou on May 30, 2021, marking the end of his 25-year-long career with FC Barcelona. 
UEFA used "Viva la Vida" as the goal celebration song for the 2012 UEFA Champions League Final and Europa League Final.

The National Hockey League's New York Rangers played "Viva la Vida" at Madison Square Garden after victories during the 2011 season.
The song was used by the Vancouver Canucks in a tribute video during Markus Näslund's number retirement ceremony held in Vancouver's Rogers Arena. It was also used in Game 7 of the 2011 Stanley Cup Finals when the Boston Bruins won the Stanley Cup on Vancouver Ice.
The Kansas City Chiefs play the song at the end of home games in Arrowhead Stadium. Additionally, it is also used by the Kansas City Royals to celebrate home runs and wins at Kauffman Stadium.
This was the at-bat music of Scott Rolen, former third baseman of the Cincinnati Reds.
The song was also used pre-match during every 2008 Rugby League World Cup game before the two teams took to the field and in the band's Super Bowl 50 halftime show in 2016 at Levi's Stadium in Santa Clara, California.

Plagiarism allegations
Coldplay were first accused of plagiarism of "The Songs I Didn't Write" by American alternative band Creaky Boards, for the melody of "Viva la Vida". Creaky Boards' band member Andrew Hoepfner claimed that Martin had heard them playing the song at a live show in October 2007. The band released a video clip, in which it compares sections of both songs. Coldplay denied the claim. Band spokesman Murray Chambers said Martin was working in AIR Studios in London at that time, having checked the singer's diary. In addition, Coldplay had recorded a demo version of "Viva la Vida" in March 2007, long before Creaky Boards performed it live in October of the same year. Creaky Boards later retracted the accusations and speculated that both songs may have been inspired by the video game The Legend of Zelda.

On 4 December 2008, American guitarist Joe Satriani filed a copyright infringement suit against Coldplay in Los Angeles. The suit claims that "Viva la Vida" incorporates "substantial, original portions" of his instrumental track "If I Could Fly" from his 2004 album Is There Love in Space?  The band has denied the allegation, saying the similarities were "entirely coincidental".  On 14 September 2009, the case was dismissed by the California Central District Court, with both parties potentially agreeing to an out-of-court settlement.

In May 2009, Yusuf Islam stated that the song is very similar to his song "Foreigner Suite," recorded under his former stage name, Cat Stevens. He said "My son brought it to my attention and said: 'Doesn't that sound like 'Foreigner Suite?'" Islam said that any legal action he might take "depends on how well Satriani does." Coldplay drummer Will Champion denied the claim, stating, "We're confident we haven't done anything wrong."  In June 2009, Islam later said, "They did copy my song but I don't think they did it on purpose," adding, "I don't want them to think I am angry with them. I'd love to sit down and have a cup of tea with them and let them know it's okay."

In a documentary for Sveriges Television (2011) American music professor Dr. Lawrence Ferrara showed that the melody structures of "Viva la Vida", "If I Could Fly" and "Foreigner Suite" were very similar to the composition "Se tu m'ami" by the Italian composer Giovanni Battista Pergolesi, who died in 1736. "Obviously this is a work that we would call in the 'public domain'", Dr. Ferrara said.

Chris Martin once said that the plagiarism allegations were inspiring him and added: "If everyone's trying to take away our best song, then we'd better write 25 better ones!" Will Champion has also talked about the accusation saying, "For some reason, God only knows why, the successful songs seem to be the ones that are accused of being stolen."

Formats and track listings

Credits and Personnel 

 Chris Martin – lead vocals, acoustic guitar, piano, keyboards
 Guy Berryman – bass guitar, synthesizers, backing vocals
 Jonny Buckland – electric guitar, backing vocals, keyboard
 Will Champion – drums, percussion, backing vocals

Additional Personnel 

 Brian Eno – sonic landscapes
 Mike Kezner – sitar
 Davide Rossi – strings

Live version

The song and "Lost+" were performed live at the 51st Annual Grammy Awards, which took place at the Staples Center in Los Angeles, on 8 February 2009. Coldplay performed a medley of "Lost+" and "Viva la Vida" at the ceremony. American rapper Jay-Z, who was the guest vocalist on "Lost+", performed "Lost+" with Coldplay onstage. The performance was recorded and released on 8 February 2009.

Track listing

Cover versions

Darin version

Swedish singer Darin's cover of the song reached number 1 on 30 October 2009 on the Swedish Singles Chart and was certified Gold by the GLF in 2010. The song appears on Darin's 2010 album Lovekiller.

In 2010, it was yet again included as the B-side of Darin's "You're Out of My Life" single, reaching #3 in the Swedish Singles Chart.

Coldplay's original single had already charted in Sweden for a total of 49 weeks between 15 May 2008 and 23 October 2009, peaking at number seven.

Other versions
 2Cellos performed an instrumental cover of "Viva la Vida" in their debut album 2Cellos.
 Weezer included their cover version of the song on the deluxe edition of their 2010 album Hurley.
 Electropop artist Joy Electric covered the song on the 2009 album Favorites at Play.
 Australian singer Mark Vincent recorded a version for his 2013 album The Quartet Sessions
 Scott Bradlee's Postmodern Jukebox recorded a cover on YouTube and on the album Top Hat on Fleek, with Puddles Pity Party as the lead vocalist.
 Pet Shop Boys performed the song live on their 2009 Pandemonium Tour and the song appeared on their Christmas EP.
 DJ Trance Winter included a Trance remix version of "Viva la Vida" in their album I'm Here in 2016.
 German violinist David Garrett recorded a cover of Viva la Vida, made with a loop station, included on his 2012 album "Music".
 Rapper Shawty Lo sampled "Viva la Vida" in his 2009 song "Roll the Dice", which was released to celebrate the ending of his feud with fellow rapper T.I. over the prior year.
 Boy band supergroup NKOTBSB performed a medley of their songs "Single" and "The One" over the instrumentation of "Viva la Vida" to open each of their concerts during their 2011-12 tour.
 Canadian rapper Drake sampled "Viva la Vida" in his song "Congratulations" from his 2009 mixtape "So Far Gone".
 Canadian country, bluegrass, and folk duo The Abrams recorded it for their 2012 album Northern Redemption.
 Call It Kingdom Rule recorded a cover on its album, When I Ruled the World (I Use to Play in the Cold) [Tribute to Bastille, John Legend, Christina, Coldplay & Jason Derulo].
 Canadian folk singer-songwriters J. P. Cormier and Dave Gunning recorded their take of the song working in separate studios in early 2020 during COVID-19 restrictions.

 Rosé, a member of the South Korean girl group Blackpink uploaded a cover on her YouTube channel on her 25th birthday.
 Gregorian, a German  music group, released Viva la Vida in Gregorian Chant-style on their album 20/2020 in 2020.

In popular culture
 Coldplay performed the song at the 2012 Summer Paralympics closing ceremony (the ceremony to mark the end of the Paralympic Games, and so also the end of the 2012 Summer Olympics and 2012 Summer Paralympics).
The song was performed as part of Coldplay’s Super Bowl 50 halftime show performance.
 The song was performed simultaneously by amateur musicians across the UK on 9 September 2012 as part of the Bandstand Marathon, the finale event of the 2012 Cultural Olympiad.
 It was the last song played by Chris Moyles on his final BBC Radio 1 breakfast show on Friday 14 September 2012, the longest-running breakfast show in BBC Radio 1's history.
 A portion of the song was used in The Simpsons episode "Million Dollar Maybe".
 The song was used in the official soundtrack for The Big Year.
 The song was played to the crew of the Space Shuttle Atlantis to wake them up on day two of STS-135, the final mission of the Space Shuttle program. It was played for crew member Douglas Hurley.
 The song was used as a fanfare to welcome the Singapore Armed Forces Parachute Team (better known as the Red Lions) during the National Day Celebrations of 2011 in Singapore.
 The song was used by the Dutch People's Party for Freedom and Democracy (VVD) when Party Leader and Prime Minister Mark Rutte walked on stage to present his acceptance speech after winning the 2012 parliamentary elections.
 The song also appears on NBA 2K13 as part of the game's soundtrack.
 "Viva la Vida" has also been spoofed in a music video titled "Fallen Kingdom", created by YouTubers CaptainSparklez and TryHardNinja, in the style of the popular videogame Minecraft.
 This song has since been used as the main theme of Indonesian television channel ANTV, as part of the channel's 20th anniversary.
 As of 8 October 2011, the song has been made available for download in Rock Band 3 as by itself or as part of the "Coldplay Collection 1" track pack. 
 The song was played in a montage for Jerry Lewis in his work to receive the Jean Hersholt Humanitarian Award at the 81st Academy Awards.
 The song was played in honor of Markus Näslund for his Vancouver Canucks jersey retirement ceremony on 11 December 2010. The song was played in the video tribute for Näslund.
 "Viva la Vida" was used as FC Barcelona's season ending song of their historic 2008–09 FC Barcelona season as they won all six major trophies in European football league.
 The song was played in honor of retiring Phil Taylor after the 2018 PDC World Darts Championship final against Rob Cross
 The song was played at the conclusion of the series finale of the television show Suits, "One Last Con."
 The song was played in the Little Howard's Big Question episode, "Can I Wrestle Control of the Weather from Sian Lloyd's Evil Grip?".
 The song was played at the retirement ceremony of tennis legend Roger Federer in 2022 Laver Cup.

Charts

Weekly charts

Year-end charts

Decade-end charts

All-time charts

Certifications

See also
 List of best-selling singles
 List of best-selling singles in the United States
 List of Billboard Adult Contemporary number ones of 2009

References

External links
 Frida Kahlo's "Viva la Vida"

2000s ballads
2008 songs
2008 singles
Coldplay songs
Darin (singer) songs
Grammy Award for Song of the Year
Billboard Hot 100 number-one singles
Dutch Top 40 number-one singles
Music videos directed by Anton Corbijn
Music videos directed by Hype Williams
Number-one singles in Sweden
Parlophone singles
Capitol Records singles
Universal Music Group singles
Song recordings produced by Brian Eno
Song recordings produced by Jon Hopkins
Song recordings produced by Markus Dravs
Song recordings produced by Rik Simpson
Songs about kings
Songs about revolutions
Songs written by Chris Martin
Songs written by Jonny Buckland
Songs written by Guy Berryman
Songs written by Will Champion
UK Singles Chart number-one singles
Torch songs
Songs involved in plagiarism controversies
Rock ballads
Baroque pop songs